Sir Alexander Cairnes, 1st Baronet (1665 – 30 October 1732) was an Irish politician and banker.

Background
He was the oldest son of John Cairnes of Donoghmore, co. Donegal, and his wife Jane Miller, daughter of James Miller, MD. His younger brother was William Cairnes. During his military service, he became friend with John Churchill, 1st Duke of Marlborough.

Career
Cairnes served in the British Army and took part in the Battle of Blenheim. For this, he was created a baronet, of Monaghan, in Ireland by Queen Anne of Great Britain on 6 May 1708, with a special remainder to his youngest brother Henry. In 1710, Cairnes entered the Irish House of Commons for Monaghan Borough, representing it until 1713. Subsequently, he was returned for Monaghan County until 1727, when he stood also for Monaghan Borough. He was elected for both constituencies, however chose the latter and sat for it as Member of Parliament until his death in 1733. Cairnes was appointed Keeper of Phoenix Park in 1712.

Thomas Sheridan thought him "an eminent Banker", but Jonathan Swift dismissed him as "a scrupulous puppy" and "a shuffling scoundrel".

Family
On 17 February 1697/98, he married Elizabeth Gould, daughter of John Gould and sister of Sir Nathaniel Gould, at St Peter le Poer in London, and had by her a daughter and a son, Mary and William Henry.

Elizabeth died at Monaghan before 4 June 1731, when the administration of her estate was granted to her husband. Cairnes died at Dublin on 30 October 1732 and his son having predeceased him, was succeeded in the baronetcy according to the special remainder by his brother. His daughter was fostered and educated by Sarah Churchill, Duchess of Marlborough.

Mary Cairnes (died 28 August 1790) married Baron Blayney, and at the time of Cairnes's death, she was a childless widow. She subsequently remarried, in 1734, to Col. John Murray, who was Member of Parliament for Monaghan County in the early 1740s. Murray died on 29 June 1743 leaving his wife with several daughters. One of the daughters, Elizabeth, married Robert Cuninghame, 1st Baron Rossmore, and another, Harriet, was the mother of Warner Westenra, 2nd Baron Rossmore, who succeeded to his maternal aunt's husband's barony by special remainder.

References

1665 births
1732 deaths
Baronets in the Baronetage of Great Britain
Irish bankers
Irish MPs 1703–1713
Irish MPs 1713–1714
Irish MPs 1715–1727
Irish MPs 1727–1760
Members of the Parliament of Ireland (pre-1801) for County Monaghan constituencies